The 2019 All-Ireland Minor Hurling Championship was the 89th staging of the All-Ireland Minor Hurling Championship since its establishment by the Gaelic Athletic Association in 1928. The championship began on 27 April 2019 and ended on 18 August 2019.

Galway were the defending champions.

On 18 August 2019, Galway won the championship after a 3-14 to 0-12 defeat of Kilkenny in the All-Ireland final. This was their 13th title overall and their third title in succession.

Competition format

The championship begins on a provincial basis in only two of the four provinces – Munster and Leinster. There is no Ulster Championship as Ulster teams participate in the Leinster Championship. Galway are the sole Connacht representatives and enter the competition at the All-Ireland quarter-final group stage with the beaten Leinster and Munster finalists. This ensures that Galway have at least two championship games.

Leinster Minor Hurling Championship

Leinster Group Stage

Tier 1

Tier 1 Table

{| class="wikitable" style="text-align:center"
!width=20|
!width=150 style="text-align:left;"|Team
!width=20|
!width=20|
!width=20|
!width=20|
!width=30|
!width=30|
!width=20|
!width=20|
|- 
|1||align=left| Kilkenny ||3||3||0||0||8-57||5-32||+34||6
|- 
|2||align=left| Dublin ||3||1||1||1||6-45||3-42||+12||3
|- 
|3||align=left| Wexford ||3||1||1||1||7-43||8-38||+2||3
|- 
|4||align=left| Offaly ||3||0||0||3||4-30||9-63||-48||0
|}

Tier 1 results

Tier 2

Tier 2 Table

{| class="wikitable" style="text-align:center"
!width=20|
!width=150 style="text-align:left;"|Team
!width=20|
!width=20|
!width=20|
!width=20|
!width=30|
!width=30|
!width=20|
!width=20|
|- 
|1||align=left| Laois ||3||3||0||0||9-55||3-31||+42||6
|- 
|2||align=left| Kildare ||3||2||0||1||5-48||3-31||+23||4
|- 
|3||align=left| Antrim ||3||1||0||2||3-44||10-47||-24||2
|- 
|4||align=left| Westmeath ||3||0||0||3||4-25||5-63||-41||0
|}

Tier 2 results

Tier 3

Tier 3 Table

{| class="wikitable" style="text-align:center"
!width=20|
!width=150 style="text-align:left;"|Team
!width=20|
!width=20|
!width=20|
!width=20|
!width=30|
!width=30|
!width=20|
!width=20|
|- 
|1||align=left| Carlow ||2||2||0||0||9-38||1-08||+54||4
|- 
|2||align=left| Meath ||2||1||0||1||3-31||5-24||+1||2
|- 
|3||align=left| Down ||2||0||0||2||2-11||8-48||-55||2
|}

Tier 3 results

Round 1

Round 2

Leinster Quarter-finals

Leinster Semi-finals

Leinster Final

Munster Minor Hurling Championship

Munster group table

{| class="wikitable" 
!width=20|
!width=150 style="text-align:left;"|Team
!width=20|
!width=20|
!width=20|
!width=20|
!width=30|
!width=50|
!width=20|
!width=20|
|- style="background:#ccffcc" 
|1||align=left| Limerick ||4||2||2||0||3-70||2-55||+18||6
|- style="background:#ccffcc"
|2||align=left| Clare ||4||3||0||1||2-61||3-51||+7||6
|-
|3||align=left| Cork ||4||2||1||1||5-73||2-68||+14||5
|- 
|4||align=left| Tipperary ||4||1||0||3||6-57||9-79||-31||2
|-
|5||align=left| Waterford ||4||0||1||3||3-54||3-62||-8||1
|}

Munster group matches

Munster Round 1

Munster Round 2

Munster Round 3

Munster Round 4

Munster Round 5

Munster Final

All-Ireland Minor Hurling Championship

For official fixtures and results see All Ireland Minor Hurling Championship @ gaa.ie

Quarter-Final Group Stage

Quarter-Final Group Table

{| class="wikitable" 
!width=10|
!width=170 style="text-align:left;"|Team
!width=10|
!width=10|
!width=10|
!width=10|
!width=30|
!width=30|
!width=10|
!width=10|
|- style="background:#ccffcc"
|1||align=left|Galway||2||2||0||0||4-40||3-38||5||4
|- style="background:#ccffcc"
|2||align=left|Kilkenny||2||1||0||1||4-30||3-29||4||2
|- 
|3||align=left|Clare||2||0||0||2||1-35||3-38||-9||0

|-|align=left|
|colspan="10" style="border:0px;font-size:85%;"| Green background The top two teams will advance to the All-Ireland semi-finals.
|}

Quarter-Final Rounds 1 to 3

Semi-finals

Final

Championship statistics

Top scorers

Top scorer overall

Top scorers in a single game

Miscellaneous

 Wexford won the Leinster Championship for the first time since 1985.

References

External links
 Electric Ireland Leinster Minor Hurling Championship 2019
 2019 Electric Ireland Munster GAA Hurling Minor Championship

Minor
All-Ireland Minor Hurling Championship